Nursultan Kairatuly Belgibayev (Nūrsūltan Qairatūly Belgıbaev; born August 3, 1991) is a Kazakhstani professional ice hockey forward currently playing for HC Almaty of the Kazakhstan Hockey Championship (KAZ). He formerly played with Barys Astana in the Kontinental Hockey League (KHL). On May 26, 2017, Belgibayev was signed to a two-year contract extension to continue with Astana from whom he has been under contract for the entirety of his professional career.

Career statistics

Regular season and playoffs

International

References

External links

1991 births
Living people
Sportspeople from Astana
HC Almaty players
Barys Nur-Sultan players
Kazakhstani ice hockey forwards
Nomad Astana players
Snezhnye Barsy players
Asian Games gold medalists for Kazakhstan
Medalists at the 2017 Asian Winter Games
Asian Games medalists in ice hockey
Ice hockey players at the 2017 Asian Winter Games
Universiade medalists in ice hockey
Universiade silver medalists for Kazakhstan
Competitors at the 2013 Winter Universiade
Competitors at the 2015 Winter Universiade